Italian motor manufacturer Alfa Romeo has participated many times in Formula One. It currently participates as Alfa Romeo F1 Team Stake while being operated by Sauber Motorsport AG. Following these successes, Alfa Romeo withdrew from Formula One.

During the 1960s, although the company had no official presence in the top tier of motorsport, several Formula One teams used independently developed Alfa Romeo engines to power their cars. In the early 1970s, Alfa provided Formula One support for their works driver Andrea de Adamich, supplying adapted versions of their 3-litre V8 engine from the Alfa Romeo Tipo 33/3 sports car to power Adamich's McLaren and March entries. None of these engine combinations scored championship points.

In the mid-1970s, Alfa engineer Carlo Chiti designed a flat-12 engine to replace the T33 V8, which achieved some success in taking the 1975 World Sportscar Championship. Bernie Ecclestone, then owner of the Brabham Formula One team, persuaded Alfa Romeo to supply this engine free for the 1976 Formula One season.

This second period as a constructor was less successful than the first.

The Alfa Romeo logo returned to Formula One in 2015, appearing on the Scuderia Ferrari cars.

Pre-war European Championship and post-war Grands Prix

Alfa Corse and Scuderia Ferrari (1920s–1940s) 
Alfa Romeo had often been a force in Grand Prix racing before World War II. Cars like the P2 and the P3 were winners regularly until the German Mercedes and Auto Union cars came around in 1934; Alfa by this time had withdrawn temporarily as a manufacturer from racing but continued to give direct support to privateers like Enzo Ferrari and his Scuderia Ferrari team. From 1934 to the start of World War II in 1939, Alfa rarely won and their cars looked rather outdated and badly built compared to the high-tech Mercedes. Alfa was able to make the 158 for the 1938 season, although this car was not competitive against Mercedes; but was to become dominant later on; Alfa continued to use this car at Grands Prix in 1946 to 1949. When the new Formula One World Championship had come around, Alfa had dominated post-WWII racing from 1946 to 1949 – winning every Grand Prix they entered except for 3.

FIA World Championship

Alfa Romeo S.p.A. (1950–1951) 

In 1950 Nino Farina won the inaugural World Championship of Drivers in a 158 with a supercharger, in 1951 Juan Manuel Fangio won while driving an Alfetta 159 (an evolution of the 158 with a two-stage compressor). The Alfetta's engines were extremely powerful for their capacity: in 1951 the 159 engine was producing around  but this was at the price of fuel consumption of 125 to 175 litres per 100 km (1.5 mpg–U.S. / 3 mpg–imp). In 1952, facing increased competition from their former employee, Ferrari; Alfa Romeo, a state-owned company, decided to withdraw after a refusal of the Italian government to fund the expensive design of a new car to replace their 13-year-old workhorse. Surprisingly, Alfa Romeo involvement in racing was made with a very thin budget, using mostly pre-war technology and material during the two seasons. For instance, the team won two championships using only nine pre-war built engine blocks.

Autodelta, Marlboro and Benetton Team Alfa Romeo (1979–1985) 

During 1977, and after some persuasion by Chiti, Alfa Romeo gave Autodelta permission to start developing a Formula One car on their behalf. Thus named the Alfa Romeo 177, the car made its debut at the 1979 Belgian Grand Prix. The partnership with Brabham had finished before the end of the season, with Bernie Ecclestone's outfit returning to Ford/Cosworth DFV engines. This second Alfa works Formula One project was never truly successful during its existence from the middle of 1979 until the end of 1985. During this period Alfa Romeo achieved two pole positions, Bruno Giacomelli led much of the 1980 United States Grand Prix before retiring with electrical trouble, three 3rd places, two 2nd places and one fastest lap. They also endured tragedy when their driver Patrick Depailler was killed testing for the 1980 German Grand Prix at the Hockenheimring. In  they had the services of Mario Andretti but continued to be dogged by poor reliability. The team's best season was  when the team switched to the turbocharged 890T V8 engine and achieved 6th place in the Constructors' Championship, largely thanks to two second-place finishes for Andrea de Cesaris.

While the turbocharged 890T proved competitive in 1983, more powerful and fuel-efficient engines from BMW, Ferrari, Renault, TAG-Porsche and Honda, plus the FIA imposed 220-litre fuel limit with no re-fuelling allowed during pit stops during , saw the decline of the Euro racing Alfa Romeo team as a competitive force in Grand Prix racing. The 890T (the only turbo V8 engine used in GP racing at this time) was very thirsty and suffered badly at fast circuits- particularly both of Alfa's home circuits of Imola and Monza. To temporarily rectify this problem, the team had to run with less boost to save fuel- which made the engine underpowered, and this proved to be a severe hindrance at fast circuits- the kind of circuits where they almost always had to do that. The engine was developed but the fuel consumption problems were never really rectified. Riccardo Patrese's third-place finish at the 1984 Italian Grand Prix being the last podium finish for the team, with both Patrese and Eddie Cheever often failing to finish races throughout 1984 and  due to running out of fuel- Cheever ran out of fuel 5 laps before the end at Alfa's home Grand Prix at Monza- close to Alfa's headquarters in Milan.

The team's 1985 car, the Alfa Romeo 185T proved to be so uncompetitive that the 1984 car, the 184T was re-called into service mid-season. After being updated to 1985 specifications the car, now dubbed the 184 TB, was an improvement over the 1985 car, but results were still not forthcoming. In an interview he gave in 2000, Riccardo Patrese described the 185T as "the worst car I ever drove".

Alfa Romeo pulled out of Formula One as a constructor following the final race of the 1985 season in Australia.

Alfa Romeo Racing/F1 Team (2019–2023)

In January 2019, Sauber announced the team would rename to Alfa Romeo Racing, but unlike BMW Sauber, the ownership, Swiss racing licence and management structure would remain unchanged. Alfa Romeo's challenger for the  season was the C38, continuing the naming convention from previous Sauber Formula One cars. The C38 included unique aerodynamic design elements in comparison to its rivals and predecessors, particularly at the front of the car as a result of regulation changes for the new season. 2007 world champion Kimi Räikkönen and former Sauber reserve driver Antonio Giovinazzi were hired as the team's drivers. Giovinazzi briefly led the Singapore Grand Prix for four laps, the first Alfa Romeo driver to lead a lap since Andrea de Cesaris did so at the 1983 Belgian Grand Prix. The team's best result of the year came at the chaotic Brazilian Grand Prix, where Räikkönen and Giovinazzi were classified 4th and 5th respectively. Alfa Romeo finished the year in 8th place in the Constructors' Championship with 57 points.

Alfa Romeo entered the  season with an unchanged driver lineup. In January 2020, the team announced that they would enter a title sponsorship arrangement with Polish oil company PKN Orlen (renaming the team as Alfa Romeo Racing Orlen in 2020 and 2021 and as Alfa Romeo F1 Team Orlen in 2022) and that Robert Kubica would join as a reserve driver.

Alfa Romeo Racing would remain as the team's name after Sauber and Alfa Romeo had reached an agreement in July 2021.

Räikkönen retired from Formula One after concluding the 2021 season while Giovinazzi departed the team to compete in Formula E. The team signed former Mercedes driver Valtteri Bottas and Formula 2 graduate Zhou Guanyu for the  season.

In January 2023, Alfa Romeo announced a multi-year title sponsorship agreement with online casino Stake. The partnership sees Stake as the principal partner, renaming the team as Alfa Romeo F1 Team Stake and having their logo displayed prominently on the C43. The team also signed a partnership agreement with live streaming platform Kick, which is invested by Stake co-founder and owner Eddie Craven. Kick's name and logo will replace Stake's in countries where gambling and sports betting advertisements are not allowed.

Alfa Romeo are due to pull out of Formula One at the end of 2023 and ending their partnership with Sauber, who are set to launch a works partnership with Audi in 2026.

Engine supplier

Naturally aspirated engines (1960s and 1970s) 

During the 1960s, several minor F1 teams used Alfa Romeo straight-4 engines in cars such as the LDS Mk1 and Mk2 "Specials", Coopers and De Tomasos.

In 1962, Peter de Klerk created a custom-made, single-seater racing special built for the South African Formula One Championship. De Klerk's car was powered by an Alfa Romeo Giulietta 1.5-litre straight-4 engine that was also used by LDS, but unlike the LDS cars, de Klerk's car was christened as the Alfa Special. The Special participated in two Grands Prix, retiring at the 1963 South African Grand Prix and finishing 10th at the 1965 South African Grand Prix. It also entered five non-championship Grands Prix, scoring a podium finish at the 1963 Rand Grand Prix.

In the end of the 1960s, Alfa Romeo was developing a new V8 engine for its racing cars, this engine was tested briefly in Cooper T86C F1-3-68 by Lucien Bianchi. In 1970 the unit was mainly entrusted to Andrea de Adamich, a long time Alfa driver, in a third works McLaren. The combination often failed to qualify and was uncompetitive when it did run in the races. In 1971 a similar arrangement saw de Adamich run most of the second half of the season in a works March car, with a similar lack of success.

In 1976 Bernie Ecclestone did a deal for the Brabham Formula One team to use Alfa Romeo engines based on their new flat-12 sports car unit, designed by Carlo Chiti. Packaging the engines was difficult – they had to be removed to change the spark plugs – and the high fuel consumption engine required no fewer than four separate fuel tanks to contain  of fuel. Gordon Murray's increasingly adventurous designs, like the BT46 which won two races in 1978, were partly a response to the challenge of producing a suitably light and aerodynamic chassis around the bulky unit. When aerodynamic ground effect became important in 1978, it was clear that the low, wide engines would interfere with the large venturi tunnels under the car which were needed to create the ground effect. At Murray's instigation, Alfa produced a narrower V12 design in only three months for the 1979 season, but it continued to be unreliable and fuel inefficient.

Turbo engines (1980s) 
For the 1987 season, Alfa Romeo made a deal to supply engines to Ligier. A Gianni Tonti designed,  twin turbo 1500 cc straight-4 named the Alfa Romeo 415T was tested in a Ligier JS29 by René Arnoux. When Fiat (the same company that owned F1 giant Ferrari) took control of Alfa Romeo, the deal was cancelled (ostensibly due to negative remarks by Arnoux about the engine, comparing it to used food) and Ligier had to use Megatron (ex BMW) engines for the entire 1987 season.

Alfa also supplied engines to the small and unsuccessful Italian Osella team from 1983 to 1988. Normally aspirated (1983) and turbo (1984–1987) engines were used. In the beginning, Alfa also offered some technical input to the small Turin team; the 1984 Osella (the model FA 1/F) was based on the 1983 works Alfa Romeo 183T, the first chassis was a lightly reworked 183T. All the following Osella models up to the FA1L in 1988 had their origins in the 183T design.

By 1988, the last turbo season, Alfa was fed up with the negative publicity generated by Enzo Osella's cars, so the Milan-based manufacturer prohibited the further use of its name in connection with the engine. The 1988 engines were simply dubbed "Osella V8". At the end of that season, the relationship finished, ending Alfa Romeo's involvement in Formula One.

Naturally aspirated V10 (1985)
In 1985, Alfa Romeo started a V10 Formula One engine project, in anticipation of the upcoming rules forbidding turbo engines. The engine was targeted to be used with Ligier Formula One cars. This was the first modern V10 Formula One engine, followed soon by Honda and Renault engines. The Alfa Romeo V1035 F1 engine was designed by Pino D'Agostino during the 1986 season. In its first stage the 3.5 litre engine produced  and the last version from 1986 could produce  at 13300 rpm. After the co-operation with Ligier was cancelled the engine was available to the 164 Pro Car project.

In 1988, Alfa Romeo (Fiat Group) bought Motor Racing Developments Ltd. (otherwise known as the Brabham F1 team) to build a chassis for a new ProCar series. The car developed was V10 powered Alfa Romeo 164 ProCar (Brabham BT57) and was planned to race in a special racing series (as a support event to Formula One Grands Prix).

Team partnerships

Scuderia Ferrari (2015–2018) 
Alfa Romeo branding has appeared on the Scuderia Ferrari Formula One cars from the 2015 until the 2018 season, starting with the Ferrari SF15-T.

Sauber F1 Team (2018) 

On 29 November 2017, it was announced that Alfa Romeo would be the title sponsor of the Sauber Formula One team starting from the 2018 season in a "multi-year technical and commercial partnership agreement". On 2 December 2017, a press conference was held at the Alfa Romeo Museum in Arese (Milan), illustrating the terms of the agreement between the FCA Group and the Swiss Sauber team, followed by a presentation ceremony for the livery and the driver line-up consisting of Charles Leclerc and Marcus Ericsson. A January 2018 interview with Frederic Vasseur revealed that Alfa Romeo were intending to take over the Sauber team, and on 1 February 2019 it was announced that the team would enter the  season as Alfa Romeo Racing, although the ownership and management structure will remain unchanged for the season.

Complete Formula One results 

(Bold indicates championships won)

* – Season in progress.

Drivers' Champions
  Giuseppe Farina
  Juan Manuel Fangio

Formula One customer engine results 

 Excludes factory team

See also 

 Alfa Romeo in motorsport

References 
Citations

Bibliography

External links

Formula One entrants
Formula One engine manufacturers
Italian auto racing teams
Italian racecar constructors
Swiss auto racing teams
Swiss racecar constructors
1950 establishments in Italy
Auto racing teams established in 1950
Auto racing teams disestablished in 1951
Auto racing teams established in 1979
Auto racing teams disestablished in 1985
Auto racing teams established in 2019
Alfa Romeo in Formula One
Sauber Motorsport
McLaren Group